Osmo Tapio Everton Räihälä (born 15 January 1964; name sometimes spelled without [[Finnish orthography#The extra letters Ä and Ö'|umlauts]]) is a Finnish composer of contemporary music. He has mainly written instrumental music for various chamber music line-ups, five concertos (one for mallet instruments, a viola concerto, an oboe, a cello, and a French horn concerto) as well as for symphony orchestra.

Life and career
Räihälä was born in Suomussalmi. He has studied under Harri Vuori. His best-known work is the 2005 orchestral portrait Barlinnie Nine, a tribute to the Scottish football player Duncan Ferguson, then of Everton, whom Räihälä is known to be a supporter of. In 2004, another orchestral tribute, this time to the Islay single malt whisky Ardbeg, was chosen as one of recommended works in the international Uuno Klami competition. The French horn concerto received the same accolade in 2014.

Apart from the Nordic countries, Räihälä's music has been performed in the United States, United Kingdom, France, Netherlands, Germany, Russia and many other countries. The first CD recording of his works, Rock Painting, was released in 2006, and the following, Peat, Smoke & Seaweed Storm in 2014. As of 2015, Räihälä's music is represented by the German publisher Sikorski Musikverlage.

Räihälä's first book Miksi nykymusiikki on niin vaikeaa [Why Is Contemporary Music So Difficult] won the prestigious Finlandia Prize book award in nonfiction category in 2021.

 Personal life 
Räihälä stated in an interview with Sikorski magazine that he has synesthesia.

Discography
 Saatana saapuu Turkuun (KACD2001-2, 1999)
 Chadwick Drive (FFCD1025, 1999)
 Damballa (UUCD101, 2004)
 Rock Painting (UUCD103, 2006)
 Peat, Smoke & Seaweed Storm (ABCD367, 2014)
 L'homme à la licorne (OPTCD-15013, 2015)
 Kirkasvetinen (AVI8553408, 2018)
 Kalliokirskuja'' (WREC1, 2020)

References

External links
 Osmo Tapio Räihälä homepage
 Räihälä on Boosey&Hawkes's page
 Räihälä on Sikorski Musikverlage's page
 Räihälä on Music Finland
 MusicWeb review of Rock Painting
 MusicWeb rewiev of Peat, Smoke & Seaweed Storm

Finnish male composers
Finnish classical composers
20th-century classical composers
21st-century classical composers
Postmodern composers
1964 births
Living people
People from Suomussalmi
Finnish male classical composers
20th-century male musicians
21st-century male musicians
20th-century Finnish composers
21st-century Finnish composers